Oliver Cove Marine Provincial Park, also known as Port Blackney, is a provincial park at the southwest end of the Don Peninsula on the North Coast of British Columbia, Canada.  It is accessible only by boat, but lacks docks or other facilities.  The park comprises 26 hectares of marine area and 48 hectares of land area.

References

External links

Central Coast of British Columbia
Provincial parks of British Columbia
1992 establishments in British Columbia
Protected areas established in 1992
Marine parks of Canada